Do is the debut album of Dutch singer Do, including the singles "Heaven", "On and On", "Love Is Killing Me" and "Angel by My Side". Do co-wrote 4 songs on the album, "Closer to You", "Should I", "Selfish", and "I Believe in Love". It charted at No. 3 in the Netherlands and was awarded gold certification for selling over 40,000 copies.

Track listing

Chart positions

Certifications

References

2004 debut albums
Do (singer) albums

nl:Dominique van Hulst